Campbell Message (born 1 January 1975)  is a wheelchair basketball player from Australia. He was born in Melbourne, Victoria.  He was part of the silver medal-winning Australia men's national wheelchair basketball team at the 2004 Summer Paralympics.

References

Paralympic silver medalists for Australia
Wheelchair basketball players at the 2004 Summer Paralympics
Wheelchair category Paralympic competitors
Paralympic wheelchair basketball players of Australia
Living people
Medalists at the 2004 Summer Paralympics
1974 births
Paralympic medalists in wheelchair basketball
Sportspeople from Melbourne